In ancient Greek religion, The Gaze of Orpheus is derived from the antiquarian Greek myth of Orpheus and Eurydice.  Following his descent into the Underworld Orpheus disobeys Hades’ and Persephone's condition for release of his wife Eurydice.  

The Gaze of Orpheus has since been evaluated by many a philosopher and literary critic.  Common analogies are made between Orpheus's gaze and writing processes, philosophical interpretation, and artistic origins.  Some of the most famous uses of the gaze of Orpheus can be found in Maurice Blanchot’s work The Gaze of Orpheus, Geoffrey Sirc’s, The Composition’s Eye/Orpheus’s Gaze/Cobain’s Journals, and Jaques Lacan’s work on the mirror stage

Interpretations

Maurice Blanchot 
Blanchot's interpretation or use of the Gaze of Orpheus is in artistic creation. Some have offered, “...the Orpheus myth as a model which provides ways to discuss many of the features of Blanchot's work, which until now appeared not to have common thematic links” (Champagne 1254).  The path taken by Orpheus from light to dark and back to light is symbolic of the artist's journey from reality to the edges of the surreal, “…the force that enables Orpheus to cross the boundaries of light and life, and to descend to Eurydice, according to Blanchot, is that of art. Rendering this dark point, the lure, the point in which the artist's control is undermined, is also the object of the work of art.” (New Media Narratives).  Blanchot uses the myth to transcribe the creative process.  “Eurydice's disappearance symbolizes a loss that is recuperated by the compensatory gift of Orpheus's song” (Huffer 175).

Geoffrey Sirc 
Another interpretation or usage of the gaze of Orpheus is by Geoffrey Sirc.  Sirc uses Orpheus's moment of violation as argument for creative form in writing versus the standard polished text.  Urging the adolescent writer to break free of formal notions of form, Sirc views the journal as the media through which Orpheus yearns for Eurydice.  “If the Work is freed of concern, the gaze is transgressive, then we’re clearly not talking about the polished text, especially one oriented dutifully around the tiny truths available through an analysis of middle-brow media” (Sirc 14).  Sirc's primary reference to this is in Kurt Cobain's Journal's.

Jaques Lacan 
Lacan's perspective on the gaze of Orpheus is more a matter of desires and yearning.  On one hand we have Orpheus gazing towards the underworld, which serves to dissolve the connection between Orpheus and his desire, Eurydice.  On the other hand, Orpheus’ role in the upper world is to use his creativity and artistic talent to transform his desires into a recreated form.  Lacan uses the topography of the myth to construct his mirror stage.  “The mirror stage is not an isolated event or situation that results in a particular configuration of vision:  it is both a loss (of primordial polymorphous, autoerotic wholeness) and an ‘achieved anxiety’ (a precocious anticipation of an impossible maturity or return to wholeness” (Linder 82)

See also 
Orpheus
Aornum
Pimpleia
Leibethra

References 

Greek mythology